Orthetrum kollmannspergeri is a freshwater dragonfly in the Libellulidae family. The kollmannspergeri species is present in Africa and western Arabia. Due to many similarities, it is often confused with its Asian counterpart, Orthetrum taeniolatum.

See also 
 Orthetrum

References 

Insects described in 1959
Libellulidae